Cladonia amaurocraea, commonly known as the quill lichen or the quill cup lichen, is a species of fruticose, cup lichen in the Cladoniaceae family.

Taxonomy
The lichen was first described scientifically as Capitularia amaurocraea in 1810. It was transferred to the genus Cladonia in 1887. It is commonly known as quill lichen.

Description
The thallus of Cladonia amaurocraea comprises tall (15–100 mm high) and slender podetia that are irregularly or dichotomously branched. These podetia have a smooth, yellowish-green surface that is often mottled with patches of green and white. They either form a pointy tip, or a narrow cup that is either closed or has a narrow opening. The cortex contains usnic acid, while the medulla has barbatic acid.

Habitat and distribution
Cladonia amaurocraea is found in boreal forests, where it typically grows on talus deposits between boulders and on rocky ground. In North America, it is widespread throughout Canada and Alaska.

See also
List of Cladonia species

References

amaurocraea
Lichen species
Lichens described in 1810
Lichens of Europe
Lichens of North America
Taxa named by Heinrich Gustav Flörke